Onychostoma virgulatum is a species of cyprinid in the genus Onychostoma.

References

virgulatum
Cyprinid fish of Asia
Freshwater fish of China